The China Communications Standards Association (CCSA) is a Chinese professional standards organization with the responsibility for developing communications technology standards. The organization was founded on 18 December 2002, by the Chinese Ministry of Information Industry.

The CCSA participates in standards development internationally. In 2004 it became an organizational partner of the 3rd Generation Partnership Project (3GPP); it is  an organizational partner of 3GPP's rival standards body 3rd Generation Partnership Project 2 (3GPP2); in 2011 it signed a collaboration agreement with the IEEE; and it is recognized by and participates in the standardization activities of the International Telecommunication Union.

References

External links 
 

Telecommunications organizations
Mass media companies
2002 establishments in China
Companies established in 2002
2011 initial public offerings
2011 mergers and acquisitions